Meena is a fictional character who stars in the South Asian children's television show Meena created by UNICEF. The show is broadcast in the English, Bengali, Hindi, Nepali, and Urdu languages. Meena educates the children of South Asia on issues of gender, health, and social inequality through her stories in comic books, animated films, and radio series (affiliated with the BBC). 

Secondary characters of her stories include her brother Raju and her pet parrot Mithu. Her adventures include attempting to gain an education, sharing meals with Raju on an equal level, learning about HIV, how to give birth to a baby properly, and volunteering. Her stories are all advocates of changing societal and cultural norms.

Her popularity is due to her not being closely bound to just one country or culture of South Asia, but uniting the common characteristics of them all. The character of Meena was created by a team of people in UNICEF that was led by Neill McKee, head of the Communication Section in the early 1990s. He chose Rachel Carnegie as the main facilitator and brought in Ram Mohan, a famous Indian cartoonist, Dr. Mira Aghi of India as chief researcher, and Nuzhat Shahzadi as script co-writer and implementation coordinator for Bangladesh. They consulted with UNICEF teams, NGOs, and government people and carried out hundreds of focus groups and individual interviews throughout the region to arrive at the characters, names, backgrounds, and stories. The first Meena episode was launched in 1993 on Bangladesh Television in Dhaka.

See also 
 Meena (TV series)
 UNICEF Meena Media Award, given for promoting children's rights in Bangladesh

References

Further reading

External links 
 
 
 
 Download free Meena comic books from the UNICEF website
 

UNICEF
Television characters introduced in 1993
Animated characters introduced in 1993
Public service announcement characters
Female characters in animated series
Female characters in advertising
Child characters in animated television series
Child characters in advertising
Fictional South Asian people
Fictional female domestic workers
Fictional elementary school students